Oocystaceae is a family of green algae, in the order Chlorellales. The type genus is Oocystis.

List of genera
, AlgaeBase accepted the following genera:

Amphikrikos Korshikov – 6 species
Catenocystis F.Hindák – 2 species
Cerasterias Reinsch – 2 species
Chodatella Lemmermann – 4 species
Chodatellopsis Korshikov – 1 species
Chondrosphaera Skuja – 1 species
Coenolamellus Proshkina-Lavrenko – 1 species
Crucigeniella Lemmermann – 2 species
Cryocystis Kol ex Komárek & Fott – 2 species
Dactylococcus Nägeli – 2 species
Dendrocystis Iyengar – 1 species
Densicystis X.Liu, H.Zhu, H.Song, Q.Wang, X.Xiong, C.Wu, G.Liu & Z.Hu – 1 species
Didymocystis Korshikov – 2 species
Droopiella Darienko, Rad-Menéndez, C.Campbell & Pröschold – 3 species
Ecballocystis Bohlin – 9 species
Ecballocystopsis Iyengar – 5 species
Ecdysichlamys G.S.West – 5 species
Echinocoleum C.-C.Jao & K.T.Lee – 3 species
Elongatocystis L.Krienitz & C.Bock – 1 species
Eremosphaera De Bary – 8 species
Ettliella F.Hindák – 1 species
Euchlorocystis X.Liu, H.Zhu, H.Song, Q.Wang, X.Xiong, C.Wu, G.Liu & Z.Hu – 1 species
Fotterella R.Buck – 1 species
Franceia Lemmermann – 12 species
Glochiococcus De Toni – 1 species
Gloeotaenium Hansgirg – 2 species
Gloxidium Korshikov – 1 species
Granulocystis Hindák – 6 species
Granulocystopsis Hindák – 6 species
Hemichloris Tschermak-Woess & Friedmann – 1 species
Juranyiella Hortobagyi – 1 species
Keriochlamys Pascher – 1 species
Kirchneriellosaccus A.K.Islam – 1 species
Kufferathiella Molinari, Mayta & Guiry – 1 species
Lagerheimia Chodat – 25 species
Lagerheimiella  – 3 species
Makinoella Okada – 1 species
Micracantha Korshikov – 1 species
Mycacanthococcus Hansgirg – 3 species
Mycotetraedron Hansgirg – 1 species
Nephrochlamys Korshikov – 6 species
Oocystaenium Gonzalves & Mehra – 1 species
Oocystella Lemmermann – 7 species
Oocystidium Korshikov – 2 species
Oocystis Nägeli ex A.Braun – 52 species
Oocystopsis Heynig – 1 species
Oonephris Fott – 2 species
Pachycladella P.C.Silva – 3 species
Palmellococcus Chodat – 3 species
Pilidiocystis Bohlin – 2 species
Planctonema Schmidle – 1 species
Planctonemopsis Liu, Zhu, Liu, Hu & Liu – 1 species
Planktosphaerella Reisigl – 1 species
Pseudobohlina Bourrelly – 1 species
Pseudochlorococcum P.A.Archibald – 2 species
Pseudococcomyxa Korshikov – 5 species
Quadricoccopsis X.Liu, H.Zhu, H.Song, B.Liu, Q.Wang, G.Liu & Z.Hu – 3 species
Quadricoccus Fott – 5 species
Rayssiella Edelstein & Prescott – 3 species
Reinschiella De Toni – 1 species
Reticulocystis X.D.Liu, G.X.Liu & Z.Y. Hu – 1 species
Rhombocystis Komárek – 3 species
Saturnella Mattauch & Pascher – 3 species
Schizochlamydella Korshikov – 1 species
Scotiella Fritsch – 9 species
Selenoderma K.Bohlin – 3 species
Sestosoma Hortobagyi – 1 species
Siderocystopsis E.M.F.Swale – 4 species
Tetrachlorella Korshikov – 5 species
Thelesphaera Pascher – 1 species
Trigonidiella P.C.Silva – 1 species
Trochiscia Kützing – 33 species
Willea Schmidle – 10 species

References

 
Trebouxiophyceae families